Brevirostres is a paraphyletic group of crocodilians that included alligatoroids and crocodyloids. Brevirostres are crocodilians with small snouts, and are distinguished from the long-snouted gharials. It is defined phylogenetically as the last common ancestor of Alligator mississippiensis (the American alligator) and Crocodylus niloticus (the Nile crocodile) and all of its descendants. This classification was based on morphological studies primarily focused on analyzing skeletal traits of living and extinct fossil species, and placed the gharials outside the group due to their unique skull structure, and can be shown in the simplified cladogram below:

However, recent molecular studies using DNA sequencing have rejected Brevirostres upon finding the crocodiles and gavialids to be more closely related than the alligators. The new clade Longirostres was named by Harshman et al. in 2003, and can be shown in the cladogram below:

History
Brevirostres was first named by Karl Alfred von Zittel in 1890. Von Zittel considered Gavialis, the gharial, to be closely related to Tomistoma, the false gharial, and excluded them from the group. Tomistoma, as its name implies, is traditionally not considered closely related to Gavialis, but instead classified as a crocodylid. Under this classification, all members of Brevirostres are brevirostrine, or short-snouted. Recent molecular analyses support von Zittel's classification in placing Tomistoma as a close relative of Gavialis. If this classification is accepted, Brevirostres can be considered a junior synonym of Crocodylia. If Brevirostres is defined as the last common ancestor of all brevirostrines, including Tomistoma, and all of its descendants, the common ancestor's descendants would include the gharial, and thus all crocodylians.

References

Crocodilians
Crocodylia incertae sedis
Paraphyletic groups